The 2012–13 PBA season was the 38th season of the Philippine Basketball Association. The season formally opened on September 30, 2012, and finished October 25, 2013. This was the longest in PBA history with 13-month span. The season continued to use the three-conference format, starting with the Philippine Cup, or the traditional All-Filipino Conference. The mid season Commissioner's Cup will continue to feature unlimited height limit for imports. The last conference of the season, the Governors' Cup will have imports with a 6'5" height limit.

The first activity of the season was the 2012 PBA Draft held on August 19, 2012, at Robinsons Midtown Mall in Ermita, Manila.

Board of governors

Executive committee
 Chito Salud (Commissioner) 
 Robert Non (Chairman, representing Barangay Ginebra San Miguel)
 Ramon Segismundo (Vice-Chairman, representing Meralco Bolts)
 Eliezer Capacio (Treasurer, representing Petron Blaze Boosters)

Teams

Arenas

Like several Metro Manila-centric leagues, most games are held at arenas within Metro Manila, and sometimes, Antipolo. Games outside this area are called "out-of-town" games, and are usually played on Saturdays. Provincial arenas usually host one game, rarely two; these arenas typically host only once per season, but could return occasionally.

Main arenas

Out-of-town arenas

Pre-season events

Player movement

Key transactions:
Air21 Express, Petron Blaze Boosters and Barangay Ginebra San Miguel were involved in a three-way trade. Air21 acquired Nonoy Baclao and Robert Reyes from Petron Blaze and KG Canaleta and John Wilson from Ginebra. Petron Blaze received Paolo Hubalde, Magi Sison from Air21 and Air21's 2014 second round pick. Barangay Ginebra acquired Elmer Espiritu from Air21 and the team's 2013 first round pick.
Alaska, Barako Bull, Barangay Ginebra, GlobalPort and Petron Blaze were involved in a five-team trade that sent LA Tenorio to Barangay Ginebra, JV Casio and Dondon Hontiveros to Alaska, Willie Miller to GlobalPort, Hans Thiele and Wesley Gonzales to Petron Blaze and Enrico Villanueva to Barako Bull.

Notable occurrences
 Mikee Romero of Sultan 900 Capital, Inc. is expected to file for an application for a PBA franchise and will debut this season. The new team will carry the name "GlobalPort", one of Romero's business entities.
 Coca-Cola Bottlers Philippines, Inc., owner of the Powerade Tigers sent a letter to the PBA Commissioner's Office informing that the franchise will be sold to Sultan 900 Capital, Inc., owned by businessman Mikee Romero for PHP 100 million, with additional PHP 10 million for franchise application fee payable to the PBA. Under league rules, the sale will need to get an approval of two-thirds vote by the board of governors to push through. The Board of Governors unanimously approved the purchase on a special board meeting on August 17. The team is now known as the GlobalPort Batang Pier.
 The post eliminations format for this season's Governors' Cup will be changed. Instead of the round robin format that was used for the last two seasons, the conference will adapt a quarterfinal-semifinals playoff format.
 Ginebra San Miguel, Inc. announced that they will rechristen the Barangay Ginebra Kings as the Barangay Ginebra San Miguel. The team will adopt a logo with similarities to the Ginebra San Miguel logo used from 1985 to 1988.
 San Miguel-Purefoods Company, Inc. announced that they will rename the B-Meg Llamados as the San Mig Coffee Mixers.
 Energy Food & Drinks, Inc., owners of the Barako Bull Energy franchise announced that they will rename their team as the Barako Bull Energy Cola starting this season.
 The Meralco Bolts will wear their retro 1971 MICAA Meralco Reddy Kilowatts uniform for this season.

Coaching changes
 Chot Reyes of the Talk 'N Text Tropang Texters stepped down as head coach at the end of the 2011-12 season due to his appointment as head coach of Smart Gilas. Team consultant Norman Black has been appointed as head coach starting this season.
 After the approval of the sale of the Powerade franchise to GlobalPort, coach Bo Perasol requested to be released from his live contract. Glenn Capacio has been appointed as interim coach for GlobalPort.
 On August 22, Ato Agustin was relieved as the head coach of the Petron Blaze Boosters and promoted assistant coach Olsen Racela to head coach. Team consultant Rajko Toroman was assigned as assistant coach.

Opening ceremonies
The season began on September 30, with Barangay Ginebra San Miguel defeating GlobalPort Batang Pier, 110-90.

The muses for the participating teams are as follows:

2012–13 Philippine Cup

Notable events
 On November 14, Bong Ramos replaced Junel Baculi as the new head coach for the Barako Bull Energy Cola.
 On January 1, Alfrancis Chua was assigned as head coach of Barangay Ginebra San Miguel, while Siot Tanquingcen slides down as lead assistant coach.
 On January 3, Junel Baculi was appointed as head coach of GlobalPort Batang Pier. Glenn Capacio slid down as assistant coach.

Elimination round

Playoffs

Quarterfinals 

|}

|}
*Team has twice-to-beat advantage. Team #1 only has to win once, while Team #2 has to win twice.

Semifinals 

|}

Finals 

|}
Finals MVP: Ranidel de Ocampo (Talk 'N Text)
Best Player of the Conference: Jayson Castro (Talk 'N Text)

2013 Commissioner's Cup

Notable events
To accommodate the training of the Philippines men's national basketball team for the upcoming FIBA Asia Championship, the league's board of governors decided to move the season-ending Governors' Cup until August. The Commissioner's Cup will be extended until the last week of May and will adapt the tournament format of the Philippine Cup, with a shorter playoff series for the semifinal and final round. The changes in the league calendar was formally approved on February 7, during the board of governors' special meeting.
The format of the upcoming All-Star Game will be modified to feature the Philippines men's national basketball team. Instead of last year's Rookies-Sophomores-Juniors (RSJ) vs. Veterans format, the national team will go up against a selection of PBA players, a similar format used during the 2009 edition of the all-star game.
On March 8, 2013, in a game against the Alaska Aces for a battle to earn the top spot, Renaldo Balkman of the Petron Blaze Boosters had a major outburst when he claimed he was fouled after shooting an air ball inside the paint. Balkman argued with the referees, but when his argument was ignored, he shoved referees and pushed coaches and teammates that tried to calm him. After physically confronting the first referee, assistant coach Biboy Ravanes tried to calm him down but Balkman shoved Ravanes out of the way. After this, he moved to the second referee and again argued and initiated contact. At this point, Ronald Tubid, a teammate of Balkman, tried to get between him and the second referee. Balkman then moved to the third official, while being shadowed by Tubid, until he shoved Tubid out of the way. This is when another teammate, Arwind Santos, tried to intervene by putting himself between the third referee and Balkman. However, Balkman continued with his aggressive behavior, slapping Santos' arm and eventually shoving him. When Santos pushed him back, Balkman pushed him once again and then grabbed Santos' neck as their teammates tried to separate them. Balkman later apologized via his Twitter account. He said he apologized to his teammates, Santos and Santos' family as well as the team's management, and added, "Everybody does something once in a life, they’re not supposed to do. At the time I blanked out and went at it. [...] It's my first time ever in my entire life to do that." On March 11, 2013, Balkman was banned for life from the PBA. He was also fined for P250,000 or $6,150.

Elimination round

Playoffs

Quarterfinals 

|}

|}
*Team has twice-to-beat advantage. Team #1 only has to win once, while Team #2 has to win twice.

Semifinals 

|}

Finals 

|}
Finals MVP: Sonny Thoss (Alaska)
Best Player of the Conference: LA Tenorio (Ginebra)
Bobby Parks Best Import of the Conference: Robert Dozier (Alaska)

2013 Governors' Cup

Notable events

Player movement

Key transactions:

Coaching changes
Gee Abanilla was appointed as head coach of Petron Blaze Boosters. Olsen Racela was reassigned as assistant coach for the San Mig Coffee Mixers.
Ato Agustin was appointed as interim head coach of Barangay Ginebra San Miguel after Alfrancis Chua resigned from his post. He was later assigned as team manager, taking over Robert Non, who also serves as the board governor of the team.

Elimination round

Playoffs

Quarterfinals 

|}*Team has twice-to-beat advantage. Team #1 only has to win once, while Team #2 has to win twice.

Semifinals 

|}

Finals 

|}
Finals MVP: Marc Pingris (San Mig Coffee)
Best Player of the Conference: Arwind Santos (Petron)
Bobby Parks Best Import of the Conference: Marqus Blakely (San Mig Coffee)

Individual awards

Leo Awards

Most Valuable Player: Arwind Santos (Petron)
Rookie of the Year: Calvin Abueva (Alaska)
First Mythical Team:
Arwind Santos (Petron)
Calvin Abueva (Alaska)
Ranidel de Ocampo (Talk 'N Text)
LA Tenorio (Ginebra)
Jayson Castro (Talk 'N Text)
Second Mythical Team:
Marc Pingris (San Mig Coffee)
June Mar Fajardo (Petron)
Sonny Thoss (Alaska)
Alex Cabagnot (Petron)
Cyrus Baguio (Alaska)
All-Defensive Team:
Marc Pingris (San Mig Coffee)
Sonny Thoss (Alaska)
Arwind Santos (Petron)
Gabe Norwood (Rain or Shine)
Marcio Lassiter (Petron)
Most Improved Player: Niño Canaleta (Air 21)
Sportsmanship Award: JV Casio (Alaska)

Awards given by the PBA Press Corps
 Scoring Champion: Gary David (GlobalPort)
 Baby Dalupan Coach of the Year: Luigi Trillo (Alaska)
 Mr. Quality Minutes: Jervy Cruz (Rain or Shine)
 Comeback Player of the Year: Marcio Lassiter (Petron Blaze)
 Danny Floro Executive of the Year: Robert Non and Chito Salud
 Defensive Player of the Year: Marc Pingris (San Mig Coffee)
All-Rookie Team
Calvin Abueva (Alaska)
June Mar Fajardo (Petron Blaze)
Alex Mallari (Petron Blaze/San Mig Coffee)
Cliff Hodge (Meralco)
Chris Tiu (Rain or Shine)

Cumulative standings

Elimination rounds

Playoffs

Notes

References

External links
PBA.ph

 
PBA